Internet Service Providers Association may refer to:
 Internet Service Providers Association Bangladesh (ISPAB)
 Internet Service Providers Association (South Africa)
 Internet Service Providers Association (United Kingdom)
Internet Service Providers Association of Ireland

See also 
 ISPA (disambiguation)
 Indonesia Internet Exchange
 Tanzania Internet eXchange
 Johannesburg Internet Exchange
 DNS Belgium